Darlington TMD was a railway traction maintenance depot situated in Darlington, England. The depot code was 51A during the steam era and DN later on. It had several locations. It mainly provided for Teesside freight and local passenger routes to Penrith, Richmond and Saltburn.

History
The main depot had an 1866 roundhouse, a 9-track 1940 shed and a 1958 diesel depot.

Diesel
Darlington diesel depot was opened by Richard Nugent, MP on 17 September 1957. It had a 4-car long, 3-road running shed and a heated, enclosed, 4-car long, 2-road repair shop. Concrete frames supported brick walls and a roof with 70% glazing. 27  extractor fans cleared fumes. Four fuelling points were fed from a  tank. The washing plant had four pairs of rotating rag flails. A 2-storey block provided for 130 staff. Internal walls were of fluted asbestos sheets, aluminium-faced asbestos boards and glass. The brick stores block south of the repair shop had an oil-fired boiler in the basement. Since the 1980s the former site has been planted

Other sheds
There were also three other sheds.

1825
In 1825 a shed served the Stockton and Darlington Railway near North Rd.

1840s
Darlington Civic Trust's application to English Heritage to list the derelict shed, between Haughton Road and Dumfries Street, following a developer's request to demolish it, resulted in a Grade II* listing from 9 January 2008. The listing describes a 2-bay red brick shed with stone dressings, corrugated asbestos roof, timber ventilator, a Queen Post Roof and the remains of a fireplace, possibly a small forge.

The Civic Trust said it was built by the Great North of England Railway and dated from 1841, which is when that line opened. However, an alternative view is that it was a two-road engine shed, big enough to house four of the first main line steam engines, built by the Newcastle & Darlington Junction Railway when it opened in 1844. The Tithe map of 1847 confirms the building in this position. The listing notes that the first trains to run on the 1841 line used locomotives borrowed or purchased from the Stockton and Darlington. It also says, The architect is uncertain but it is thought to be George Townsend Andrews of York, architect of the first York Station. While this cannot be confirmed the balance of evidence supports this view as Andrews is confirmed as a prolific designer of very many railway buildings in the area including stations, goods stations and engine sheds during this period including work for the Great North of England Railway. The alternative view is that it was, Designed by George Hudson's friend, George Townsend Andrews. That view is supported by the building being in Andrews' style. It is believed to have been altered or rebuilt in 1854.

1861
An 1861. 4-road, 12-engine shed also survives in Whessoe Rd, designed by William Peachey in the angle between the S&D main line and the track serving North Road Works, into which it was merged.

Steam
In 1949 Darlington MPD had 138 locos (including (4 LMS Ivatt Class 2 2-6-0, 1 A2, 17 A5, 14 B1, 2 C7 , 3 G5, 10 J21, 12 J25, 37 J39, 10 J71, 4 J72, 12 J77, 10 J94, 3 L1, 5 N9, Q5, 2 V2)) allocated to it. By 1961 it was down to 68 steam locos (including 2 A3, 9 B1, 15 J94, 11 K1, 1 V2, 12 WD) and 27 diesel shunters.

Steam Sub-Sheds
Darlington had several sub-sheds, some of which had sub-sheds of their own. Darlington's sub-shed was Middleton-in-Teesdale (to 1957)
51B	1950–1958	Newport	[transferred to Thornaby]
51C	1950–1967	West Hartlepool	
51D	1950–1958	Middlesbrough [Sub-shed Guisborough (to 1954)]	[transferred to Thornaby]
51E	1950–1959	Stockton	[transferred to Thornaby in 1959]
51F	1950–1965	West Auckland [Sub-shed Wearhead (to 1954)]
51G	1950–1959	Haverton Hill	[transferred to Thornaby in 1959]
51H	1950–1958	Kirkby Stephen	[Became 12E]
51J	1950–1963	Northallerton [Sub-shed Leyburn (to 1954)]
51K	1950–1958	Saltburn	
51L	1958–1973	Thornaby

References

External links
Flickr photo of derelict 1840s shed
photo of Bank Top Roundhouse, showing two J72 tank locos, nos 69017 and 69021 with a diesel shunting engine, Easter 1961
Bank Top engine shed - Locomotive 42405, photographed 9 November 1963
north roundhouse shed 2 October 1932
photos of shed and works
Railscot photos of Darlington
1962 diesel depot photo
Engine Shed Society 1989 photo of closed diesel depot 

Railway depots in England
Railway roundhouses in the United Kingdom
North Eastern Railway (UK)
Rail transport in Darlington
Buildings and structures in Darlington